Querido Amigo (English: Dear Friend) is the tenth studio album by the Mexican singers Mijares and Pedro Infante. The album was released in 1996 and produced by José Luis Espinoza. It includes thirteen songs performed in duets and one trio with Daniela Romo.

History
This was a co-production between two labels: EMI International and Peerless Records. EMI had acquired Peerless and with it the rights of all the recordings of Pedro Infante who had died 39 years before. This musical project was born from the idea of the 1991 album of Natalie Cole Unforgettable... with Love, especially the song "Unforgettable" where she sings with her father, Nat King Cole, who had died 26 years before. Bebu Silvetti suggested that Daniela Romo was the one to perform the song "Enamorada" as a trio, since she had already worked with both Infante and Mijares. It was not well received by critics, although the album sold well.

Track listing
Tracks[]:
 El Muñeco de Cuerda
 Que Te Ha Dado Esa Mujer
 Cien Años
 Tu enamorado
 Tú y Las Nubes
 Tu Recuerdo y Yo
 El Último Aviso
 Tres Consejos
 Enamorada (Trio with Daniela Romo)
 El Jardinero
 Amorcito Corazón
 Nocturnal
 Mis Ojos Te Vieron

Personnel credits

Main vocals
 Mijares
 Pedro Infante
 Daniela romo

Background vocals
 Jose Alfredo Jauregui
 Nicho Moro
 Arturo Pasalagua

Percussion
 Victor Hugo Domínguez

Strings
 Felix Parra Aguilera
 Ildefonso Cedillo Blanco
 Fernando de Santiago
 Francisco Esquivel
 Verónica Ramírez
 Luis Enrique Ramos R.
 Arturo González Viveros
 Francisco Zarabozo Lopez (contrabass)

Wind
 Juan Franco Arpero
 Alejandro Esperon
 Jose Villar Fernandez
 Vicente Diaz G.
 Roberto Mendoza Navarro
 Norma Reza Reza
 Maria del Carmen Thierry
 Mariachi Xavier

Others
 Raul Garduno: piano, keyboards
 Carlos Monsivais: arrangement, mixing
 Carlos Cuevas: arrangement, mixing
 Jose Luis Rodríguez: arrangement, mixing
 Rodolfo Sánchez: arrangement, mixing
 Adolfo Pérez Butro: photography
 Jose Luis Mijares: graphic design, illustrations

1996 albums
Mijares albums